Dery or Déry is a surname, and may refer to:

 Dominika Dery (born 1975) also known as Dominika Furmanová, Czech journalist and writer
 Floro Dery, Filipino illustrator
 Hervé Déry, Canadian librarian and archivist
 Luc Déry, French Canadian film producer
 Marc Déry (born 1963), French Canadian singer and guitarist
 Mark Dery (born 1959), American author, lecturer and cultural critic
 Peter Poreku Dery (1918- 2008), Ghanaian prelate of the Roman Catholic Church
 Tibor Dery (1894-1977), Hungarian writer

See also
 Derry (disambiguation)